Czerwona Wola  (Chervona Volia) is a village in the administrative district of Gmina Sieniawa, within Przeworsk County, Subcarpathian Voivodeship, in south-eastern Poland.

The village has a population of 483.

References

Czerwona Wola